Eddy Kimani (born 31 May 1978), is a Kenyan actor, voice artist and radio presenter. He is best known for the roles in the films In a Better World, The Distant Boat and Lusala.

Personal life
He was born in May 31, 1978 in Nakuru, Kenya.

He married his longtime partner Nyambura Njenga in 2011. The couple has two children. He later separated from his wife and kids citing his mental depression.

Career
In 2006, he made the film debut with the film Money and the Cross. However, he played an uncredited role in the film. Then in 2009, he was selected for the role 'Winston Kinyang'weu' in the television serial The Agency. After that supportive role, he starred in the 2010 film In a Better World with another minor role.

First he joined with Capital FM and continued to work as a broadcaster and radio host. He also worked as a TV presenter with the national broadcaster KBC and NTV. In 2014, he was appointed as the communications director for Nakuru County Government .

Apart from acting, he is also a full time mental health advocate and campaigner. He completed the Quality Rights training course developed and provided by WHO. In 2019, he made a lead role in the television series Country Queen.

Filmography

See also
 My Life with a Criminal: Milly's Story
 My Life in Crime

References

External links
 
 Former Capital FM star reveals how his marriage collapsed due to infidelity
 My struggle with Bell’s palsy – Eddy Kimani
 “I betrayed my marriage” Former Capital FM anchor Eddy Kimani narrates how his infidelity tore apart his marriage

Living people
1978 births
People from Nakuru
21st-century Kenyan male actors
Kenyan male film actors
Kenyan broadcasters